The Chilean submarine Hyatt (S23) was an Oberon-class submarine in the Chilean Navy, originally launched under the name Condell.

Design and construction

The submarine, built by Scottish company Scott Lithgow, was laid down on 10 January 1972, and launched on 26 September 1973. The planned April 1975 completion was delayed by the need to redo internal cabling, then was pushed back further by an explosion aboard in January 1976. She was commissioned into the Chilean Navy on 27 September 1976. The submarine was named after Edward Hyatt, who died while serving aboard a Chilean warship at the Battle of Iquique, and is the second Chilean warship of the name after the 1928-launched destroyer Hyatt.

Operational history

Hyatt was in service from the mid-1970s until the late 1990s.

Decommissioning and fate
Hyatt and sister boat O'Brien were replaced by the Thomson-class submarines.

In 2003, Hyatt was sold, exported and scrapped at Puerto General San Martin near Pisco, Peru. This attracted some attention due to poor environmental processes during ship breaking at the site.

References

O'Brien-class submarines (1972)
Ships built in Barrow-in-Furness
1973 ships